A list of the various characters throughout the 2006-2007 Japanese tokusatsu series . These characters play a major role within the series and often influence many key events.

Main characters

Souji Tendou
This played in Souji having a sense that is meant for greatness that makes him initially appear arrogant but is very compassionate. He often seems to follow monk-like philosophies of peace, using the kanji in his full name to in his formal instruction:  or quoting amazingly appropriate zen-like phrases he supposedly learned from his grandmother. Having no job or college education despite being very talented, Souji normally stays home with Juka before becoming a regular customer at Bistro La Salle after meeting Hiyori Kusakabe, whom he recognizes as both the girl he saved and a Native Worm whom he considers his little sister. This played in his ability to recognize Worms in disguise merely fights for his own needs to wipe the aliens out and provoking ZECT as a result. After defeating the Worms and ZECT's corrupted higher ups, Souji leaves Japan to travel to France.

As Kamen Rider Kabuto, he is usually in his pupa-like armored  before using the Kabuto Zecter's  command to assume the sleeker and more combat-oriented  which uses the  ability to travel at near-light speeds to match the speeds of the Worms or for Kabuto to perform his tachyon-powered  finisher.

As a stronger version of Rider Form, Kabuto is capable of using the  ability to move at great enough speeds to potentially travel seven years through time as well as to perform his  finisher. By increasing the Perfect Zecter's power with the TheBee, Drake, and Sasword Zecters, he can perform one of two finishers:  via Sword Mode or  via Gun Mode.

Arata Kagami
Having joined ZECT to avenge his younger brother Ryou Kagami, works with Hiyori at Bistro La Salle, Arata has a good heart but is impulsive often acts without thinking. In the previous timeline, Kagami married a Hiyori Kusakabe before helping Souji alter the timeline so the damage caused by the Worms' meteor would be minimized in Shibuya. In the new timeline, Arata meets Souji all over again when the latter claimed the Kabuto Zecter that he was to upon its completion. Being the only member of ZECT to know Souji's identity as Kabuto, momentarily using TheBee Zecter after Yaguruma was relieved of his duty, Arata became torn between his duty to ZECT and seeing Souji as a friend.

They managed to wipe out most of the Worms before helping the rebels against the compromised ZECT led by Masato Mishima and the Native-class Worm leader Negishi. After ZECT was defeated, Arata started a new life with his father in the police force. During the events of Kamen Rider Zi-O, learning he is one of the few to remember ZECT and the Worms due to a time distortion, Arata helps the titular protagonist prevent a new Worm invasion while representing Souji.

As Kamen Rider Gatack, he is usually in his Masked Form equipped with the twin shoulder-mounted  cannons, which possess a shooting radius of 1 kilometer, before using the Gatack Zecter's Cast Off command to assume Rider Form where he gains access to the Clock Up ability and wields the twin  shotels, which consists of the gold-colored  and the silver-colored  that he can combine into a scissor-like weapon for his  finisher. Gatack once acquired the Hyper Zecter to assume Hyper form in the special Kamen Rider Kabuto Hyper Battle DVD Birth of Hyper Gatack.

Hiyori Kusakabe
 is first shown as a co-worker of Kagami's at the Bistro la Salle. She was involved in the meteor crash seven years ago along with Tendou. Due to the accident, her parents were killed. She believed that they were murdered by a person wearing a Rider Belt, but after a period of uncertainty she concludes that Tendou, despite owning the belt, would never do something like that. After seeing Gatack wear another belt and discovering that he was Kagami, she also began to doubt him. In the end however, she decides to trust both of them as they have helped her so much. She carries a green crystal that originated from Area X, ground zero of the meteor crash. She seems to be able to talk with and read the emotions of inanimate objects, such as drawings and machines. She's quite clumsy and tends to zone out while working, resulting in complaints by customers. Through several mishaps and accidents, she was able to discover the identities of all the Riders besides Drake. This technically makes her Tendou's younger sister. During episode 33, the energy charge from the Hyper Zecter sent her along with the Souji Kusakabe to the edge of time and space. The Hyper Zecter later appeared in the normal dimension, showing one of Hiyori's drawings to Tendou and Kagami.

She reappeared during episode 38, being led away by Kusakabe Souji, at the edge of time and space. She returns to the real world in episode 43 to defend Dark Kabuto from Hyper Kabuto, stating that she no longer desires to live in the human world. Ultimately however, after a compelling speech by Tendou saying that she will not be hated in the human world, even though she is a Worm, she abandons Kusakabe Souji and returns to the human world. However, she is then attacked by Dark Kabuto. After being saved by Tendou, she returns to an almost normal life, and begins making her own menu and dream of owning a restaurant come true. During the epilogue, she returns to her normal life in working at the Bistro la Salle, and now has Jyuka as a sister. As a human, she is 18 years old.

Recurring characters

Jyuka Tendou
 is presented as Souji's younger sister, but in truth she seems to be his younger cousin. They were both taken in by their grandmother after the Shibuya meteorite crash. She's really close to Souji, who she calls "older brother", and tends to act the same way he does; such as talking about her grandmother and pointing to the sky. She was injured in a car crash caused by Kamishiro, but blows it off to her brother's concern. She also assists her brother in running noodle carts across town. She has different ways of saying "Good Morning" to Tendou and loves his cooking. Lately, she has been targeted by ZECT and the Worms. So far two Worms, disguised as Misaki and Daisuke, tried to either kidnap or kill her.

She seems to be aware of the Zecters as the Kabuto, TheBee, and Drake Zecters fly around the entire Tendou household, while the Sasword Zecter crawls on the dining table. It is unclear, however, whether she knows that Souji is a Kamen Rider. During the epilogue, it is shown that she has accepted Hiyori as her "sister" and is now working with her at the Bistro la Selle. 13 years old.

Yumiko Takemiya
Hiyori and Kagami's boss at the Bistro la Salle restaurant,  seems to tolerate Hiyori's clumsiness and Kagami's tardiness. She sometimes requests Tendou to be her cook as he is a usual customer. 36 years old.

Daisuke Kazama
 is a metro-sexual make-up artist who openly befriends women, seeing them as the treasure of life. His partner, a little girl named Gon, always follows him around, completing sentences for him since Daisuke seems to be in eloquent at times. Prior to his first appearance, he accidentally found the means to become .

Gon
Real name: ,  is a girl whom Daisuke has accompanied, she seems to have amnesia but at the beginning of episode 17, she slowly remembers time before she met Kazama Daisuke. Gon also pictures her mother , but cannot make out who it is. She always completes Kazama's sentences for him, usually after make-up sessions. She is incredibly mature for her age, often taking initiatives which surprise even Souji. In the end, after remembering her mother's face on the day that they were attacked at the bus by the same Worm that tried to kill her mother, she was finally reunited with her mother. Drake killed the Worm, and Gon completely remembered her past but unfortunately forgot about Daisuke and treated him as a complete stranger afterwards. However, she regained her memories of being Gon while reading an article on Daisuke in a teen magazine. She also helps Daisuke regain his  from his Worm imitation. She recently discovered the identities of the first five Riders, when they ganged up on Daisuke, who they believed was a Worm. In her latest appearance, she has given the Drake Grip to Souji after stealing it from Daisuke. She returns to help both Daisuke and Rena with the Hopper Riders by spraying them with a fire extinguisher; however, when Rena gains her Worm memories, she is attacked by Rena. During the epilogue, she is still working with Daisuke, although no longer wearing her trademark hat. She also insists that she now be called Yuriko, not Gon. 8 years old.

Tsurugi Kamishiro
 is a descendant of the English nobility of the Discabil family, calling himself "the man who replaces the gods (Kamishiro) with a sword's slash (Tsurugi)" in his introductions. He is Souji's equal in everything but cooking and normal social skills, quoting his butler Jiiya while expressing his intent to be the best at everything. However, the Scorpio Worm's mind was completely overridden by the real Tsurugi's memories, believing himself to be Tsurugi while haunted by Mika's death to the point of disassociating himself as a Worm while vowing to kill them all. While Tsurugi is let go after Kagami becomes Gattack, he aids Souji after realizing Jiiya was teaching him to be a better person and the ways of noblesse oblige. Eventually learning of true nature as a Worm, a despairing Tsurugi aligns himself with the Worms to lead an all-out attack against the ZECT Riders. But this would turn out to be Tsurugi's plan to fulfill his promise by leading the Worms to slaughter, allowing Souji to fatally wound him with the Maximum Hyper Typhoon so Mika can be avenged before returning to his mansion to die in peace.

While his Masked Form is outfitted with  tubings that supply performance enhancing chemicals, Sasword can enter Rider Form to either access his Clock Up ability or perform his  finisher.

Jiiya
A butler who serves the Kamishiro family,  serves Tsurugi and often acts as a parental figure to him. He remains loyal to Kamishiro despite many of his rude actions. It seems that the Kamishiro wealth is no more, but Jiiya hides this fact from Tsurugi, finding ways to get money such as getting monetary reward for Sasword's killing of Worms, and after that transaction was cancelled, opening a ramen shop (which Tendou decides to take over as he sees Jiiya as too worthy to be doing this). He tells Kagami about Kamishiro's sister and her death at the hands of the Scorpio Worm. He has a younger twin brother who keeps the Legendary White Knife. He knows that Scorpio Worm is Tsurugi's true form but has chosen not to tell him because Tsurugi, as the last of the famous British Discabil family, must, in one form or another, carry on its name. Jiiya is respected by Tendou who refers to him as "Humanity's Treasure" due to his incredible skill as a chef. He has several students who hold him and high respect, and has published a cook book, which Tendou carries a copy of at all times. During the epilogue, it is revealed that he is the head cook for the Discabil Restaurant, which is owned by Misaki and named in his master's honor. 65 years old.

Souji Tendou (Native)
This mimic version of Tendou was actually a human infant that was captured by Mishima and used for his experiments after being turned into a Native.

Hiro Mizushima, who already portrays Souji Tendou, also portrays his doppelganger counterpart.

ZECT
 is a mysterious organization that seemingly acts in order to destroy Worms, later revealed to have founded by the Native Worms who created both ZECT and the Masked Rider System to eliminate the Worms before conducting Negishi's own plans for humanity.

Shuichi Tadokoro
Yuzuki and Arata's direct superior in the field,  is a very stern man who commands numerous ZECT Trooper platoons. It is hinted at that he was once the mentor of the first TheBee, Sou Yaguruma. He was seriously injured when he tried to use the Gatack Zecter in order to save Arata from being chosen. Despite his appearance, he does care a great deal about his team, especially Arata and Yuzuki and will do anything to help them. He has a younger brother who runs the buckwheat-noodle restaurant which was once his father's business. Although he was the better cook, his brother inherited it anyway. After shielding Arata, it became clear in episode 41 that his true form is a Native Worm. However, he has no intention of conquering humanity like Negishi. During the epilogue, it is shown that he has taken over the running of the aforementioned family business. Tadokoro is 35 years old.

Yuzuki Misaki
A 23-year-old technician and agent for ZECT,  travels with Kagami in the field tracking the movements of the Worms. Later on, she is given the assignment to track Souji and the stolen Kabuto Zecter. At first she is a "by-the-book" tough as nails character; however, she soon begins to question the actions of ZECT and eventually gains respect for Souji after he rescues her from the Worms. However, she was still irritated by Souji when he implies that she and Arata make a cute couple. She used herself as bait by disguising herself as Phantom Thief Shadow and tended to Arata when the Gatack Zecter attacked him. She loves buckwheat soba, and can chow down entire ramen bowls in seconds. A Worm disguised as her was sent to attack Souji's sister, but ended up meeting Tsurugi. The Worm reminded Tsurugi of his dead sister, but he ended up destroying the Worm. However, because of this, he gained a strong attraction to Yuzuki. As the series progressed, Yuzuki slowly began to reciprocate to Tsurugi's feelings, and accepted his request to spend Christmas Day with him. Unfortunately, Tsurugi became aware of the fact he was Scorpio Worm and was eventually destroyed in battle by Kabuto, despite Misaki's pleas to stop. During the epilogue, Yuzuki becomes the head of Tsurugi's corporation to honor his name. 

Sou Yaguruma
Sou's obsession to take out Souji resulted with the TheBee Zecter abandoning him with his former subordinate Shun Kageyama firing him instead of keeping him in Shadow as an advisor. After bringing Shun under his wing once more, Sou attempts to stir his partner on to see things as he does, seeing that Shun is only setting himself up for a fall at the slightest glimmer of hope while expressing a bit of envy because he could no longer feel any emotion. After all of the enemy Worms are wiped out, Yaguruma puts a mutating Shun out of his misery while seeking to honor his promise for them to see the northern lights. During the events of Kamen Rider Zi-O, Sou opposed the titular protagonist by becoming Another Rider to protect the new invading Worms so he can fulfill his promise with one that assumed Shun's form.

The differences between his God Speed Love and TV series iterations are the wrist locations of the  when he was TheBee, whereas God Speed Love has him wore it on the right wrist like other Kabutech Riders, while in TV series has him and other former TheBee users wore it on the left wrist.

As either TheBee or KickHopper, Sou uses a kick-based fighting style. As KickHopper, he uses the  joints on his left leg to either jump around or perform a Rider Kick.

Shun Kageyama
 is a former ZECT member under Sou who was the final user of the TheBee Zecter until he was kicked out of ZECT. Since then, Shun formed a partnership with his former leader after receiving his own Hopper Zecter from him and becoming . As either TheBee or PunchHopper, Shun uses a punch-based fighting style. As PunchHopper, he uses the Anchor Jack on his right arm to perform a  finisher.

Masato Mishima
The aide of ZECT HQ's leader, Riku Kagami. At times,  does communicate with Sou and Tadokoro to brief the ZECT teams about the Worms. Eventually, he was upset with Sou botching a mission and Tadokoro questioning him about ZECT's agenda. There's implication that he has no faith in Shun as TheBee, despite the latter being loyal to ZECT and is looked down upon by Tsurugi Kamishiro. He has no sense of taste, and finishes eating by taking a supplement. He forcefully became TheBee at one time despite the TheBee Zecter's attempt to reject him. He truly thinks Shun is an eyesore because he can only complain and has lost the TheBee Zecter. He also seems to have a connection to Rena Mamiya/Uca Worm and had always kept the Hyper Zecter with him. Renge manages to steal the case with the Hyper Zecter, but Uca Worm takes it back only to find that the case has been rigged with a bomb. Mishima tries to destroy the Hyper Zecter with the bomb. After the explosion, he taunts Souji for failing to obtain the Hyper Zecter, so he saved the Hyper Zecter when he used Clock-Up.  However, he doesn't realize the power of the Zecter as it manages to finds its way to Souji, much to his chagrin. He then tosses his glasses to the ground in anger. He gradually loses respect for Riku Kagami's servile manner toward the Natives. After realizing Negishi found out about the Red-Shoes system, he makes a pact with Negishi and overthrows Riku Kagami as leader of ZECT. Using the Natives' pendants, he regains the ability to turn his true form named , the strongest Native. He is defeated by Hyper Kabuto's and Gatack's Rider Kick and then destroyed by the meteorite explosion that obliterated the studio set.

Riku Kagami
Arata and Ryo's father,  is a high-ranked official in ZECT, and serves as a figurehead to hide their connection to the natives. Arata seems to despise him because of Ryo's disappearance, as well as the lack of concern or activity done in order to find Ryo. Arata is also unaware that his father is even part of the organization, ZECT, let alone the leader. A mysterious person who always quotes animal bibles, he is also the chief of police. He is a highly trained fencer and plays the cello. It seems that he has a very secret agenda and would even sacrifice his sons to achieve his goals. Tendou later confronted Riku; the confrontation ended with Riku telling him that Tendou's sister (actually refers to Hiyori, not Jyuka) was not in good hands, which naturally made Tendou lose his composure, and Riku walked off, joking about Tendou's "walking down the path to heaven to rule over all".

During the end of episode 36, he displays that he indeed knows about the Hopper Riders, saying they have opened the Gates of Hell. He also says the Rider's grand plan will be completed by our sons, showing that he did indeed know Tendou's father. He tells Kagami of the secrets behind the Masked Rider System in episode 41, displaying his knowledge of the Natives and how they created the system. He also tells Tendou that his father was the one who installed the Red Shoes system in the Zecters, and in turn, Tendou decides to trust him because he too desires to walk the path his father took. He is overthrown from his leadership position at ZECT by Mishima after revealing to Negishi the Red-Shoes system implemented into the Zecters. He is still alive in the epilogue watching his son grow up. It is likely he is now simply the chief of police. 52 years old.

Renge Takatori
Formerly a BrighTrooper,  is a trainee of ZECT and Tendou's second in command who was sent by Mishima in order to spy on and assassinate Tendou. However, she yearns for Tendou as a master after she tasted his delicious cooking. Prior to meeting Tendou, she had eaten nothing but dry boiled rice for the last seven years of her life, considering the concept of taste and deliciousness a sin. Tendou went out of the way to make sure she would be well fed. She was also the person that booted Kageyama out from the ZECT HQ. Afterwards, Mishima orders her to kill Tendou, but she is persuaded by Tendou to forget Mishima and help him steal the Hyper Zecter. She is eventually knocked over the building by the Uca Worm only to be saved by Tendou. Despite her sweet and innocent demeanor, she is a fearsome fighter armed with a wire which can cut through almost anything; however, she is still relatively weak against Worms, but tries to fight anyway. After accepting Tendou as her superior, she began to work at the Bistro la Salle, although she often misinterpreted recipes and created horrible dishes as a result. Due to her harsh bring up as a BrighTrooper, her perception of training is rough. This was seen in Episode 38 when she began to time Jyuka and her classmates in setting up tents before their camping field trip. She was hit by a bullet that ricocheted off Kabuto's Kunai Gun, but hitting her in the shoulder. As an apology, Tendou made a meal for her while she was recovering in the hospital, also giving her a letter to Kagami. During the epilogue, Renge continues to work at the Bistro la Salle. 18 years old.

Negishi
One of the leaders of the Natives,  seems like a fun loving person despite the deep respect ZECT offers to him. When he first meets Tendou, he almost admires Tendou, asking if he can be Tendou's fan. Despite his innocent look, Negishi actually has his own agenda and later carries it out once the Worms had been almost decimated. Believing Natives and humans would be unable to co-exist, Negishi sets up the plan to turn all of humanity into Native and thus achieve his ideal peace. To that, he placed Mishima as leader of ZECT and disposes Riku Kagami. But Negishi didn't count on Tendou's words to sway his comrades to have second thoughts of his plan. In the end, Dark Kabuto manages to capture him, dragging him inside the TV studio explosion that killed them off.

ZECTroopers
The weapon consists of an automatic machine gun with a retractable blade, which they use for close-quarters combat. In addition, they also carry a grenade launcher-like shotgun as a last resort and means of retreating, also they use flash bombs which disable Worms and seem to prevent them from molting. Like the Riotroopers from Kamen Rider 555, they're only Rider-like, acting as cannon fodder for emergencies when a Rider cannot arrive in time. They are transported to the Worm hotspots via black, white, or silver HUMVEEs. Unfortunately, as seen in the first episode, they lack any concern for civilians. The special team known as  assists Kamen Rider TheBee. Unlike regular ZECTroopers, they have yellow pin stripes on their uniforms. Shadow is able to prevent the Worms from molting, enabling TheBee to kill them. During a training mission, the ZECTrooper trainees, are revealed. They wear white armor instead of the standard black. During episode 41, the AM bomb is revealed, forcing current Worms disguised as humans back into their original forms. It's revealed that the majority of ZECTroopers are Native Worms. However, after a speech by Tendou, they turn on Negishi and Mishima, aiding the Riders.

Worms
The  are Arthropod-like alien lifeforms that came from a meteor that devastated the city district of Shibuya seven years prior to the series' current timeline, the meteor being part of a larger one that greatly devastated Earth in the previous timeline depicted in the film Godspeed Love. The Worms are motivated to subvert and replace the population of an area they invade, possessing the ability to replicate the appearance and memories of another being whom they kill off. Worms believe that the original will live on as a part of them, since they adopt their victim's personality traits. But there are setbacks to this process as the Worms are unable to fully replicate aspects of their victims like their scent and can forced into their true forms through certain chemicals like makeup, few having his minds overridden by the memories of the identity they stole. When threatened or endangered, a Salis Worm molts into a stronger form that can move at blinding speeds which comes from their high metabolism.

It would later be revealed that the current Worms are the second group to reach Earth, a previous group of Worms called the Natives came to Earth 35 years ago before the events of the series. Unlike their aggressive kin, the Natives learned to co-exist with humans with some creating their own human identities. They are also the ones who developed the Masked Rider System and ZECT for the purpose of fighting off the Worms.

Rena Mamiya
A cruel and clever planner,  is the one who ordered a Worm to capture (or kill) Jyuka. In Worm form, she is very powerful and on her debut, she defeated both TheBee and Drake. She is also the only Worm to "truly" defeat Tendou and make him involuntarily power down. Soon after, she discovers the existence of the Hyper Zecter and attempts to retrieve it after she shoved Renge off a building. Despite retrieving the suitcase, Mishima sets off a bomb which seemingly destroys the Hyper Zecter. Despite the massive explosion, her Worm form was apparently enough to handle and survive the explosion.

Her human form is a 25-year-old woman always dressed in black. At episode 39, she was hit by Hyper Kabuto's Hyper Sting finisher, causing amnesia with the persona of the very woman she imitated. The original Rena was a talented singer with a kind heart that wanted to help people. Believing herself to be Rena, she chases after her dream of being an opera singer until her Worm persona eventually resurfaced. She is able to sing one more requiem for Daisuke on stage, expressing her gratitude to him. Ultimately, she is fatally wounded by Kamen Rider Drake's using the Rider Shooting twice in their final battle, ending with Uca Worm ultimately dying in Daisuke's arms as a human.

Reiji Nogi
 is the boss class of the Worm army. He is dressed in a black trench coat and wields a cane which he uses in battle. Possessing uncanny martial art skills, he is powerful enough to take on Kagami and Tendou in his human form, while they are in their Rider forms. His first form, has the capability of "Freeze", which is activated by clenching his left fist. Through this, he can completely stop the flow of time to the point in which even the power of Hyper Clock Up is purposeless. During his debut, he is able to completely neutralize Hyper Kabuto, even with the Perfect Zecter. He then later was destroyed by Hyper Kabuto's Maximum Hyper Cyclone. After his demise, he evolved into a stronger form  by use of the ability, "Life of Immortality". In this form, he is able to absorb Worms and tachyon energy alike to gain their powers as shown when he absorbs two subordinate Worms and Gatack's Rider Kick. He later absorbs Sasword's Rider Slash, TheBee's Rider Sting, and Gatack's Rider Cutting; but failed to absorb a triple rider kick by Kabuto, Gatack, and KickHopper. He then later was destroyed by Hyper Kabuto's Maximum Hyper Cyclone. When Tsurugi's Worm identity exposed, the Nogis tried to recruit Scorpio Worm as their minions, but instead Scorpio Worm turned them into his minions after showing he was superior to them in power. Ultimately, they face defeat after being defeated by Gatack, KickHopper, and PunchHopper.

References

Kabuto
Kamen Rider Kabuto